Hot Water is a 1924 American silent comedy film directed by Fred C. Newmeyer and Sam Taylor and starring Harold Lloyd. It features three episodes in the life of Hubby (Lloyd) as he struggles with domestic life with Wifey (Jobyna Ralston) and his in-laws.

Plot

The film opens with Lloyd and his best friend sprinting crazily along the street to get to the friend's wedding in time.  Lloyd is impatient and resentful of all of that breathless running; he naively views being single as simpler and more desirable --- "I don't see why a man would want to run to his own wedding!  You were born a bachelor; why not just let well enough alone?"  He then snortingly opines that he himself would never give up his freedom "just for a pair of soft-boiled eyes", but then he accidentally knocks into the alluringly-lovely Jobyna Ralston, and after one look into her huge clear gentle "soft-boiled eyes", he's totally smitten.
The remainder of the film greatly changes pace.  Episodic in nature (effectively three short films merged into one), the first episode features Hubby (Lloyd) winning a live turkey in a raffle and taking it home on a crowded streetcar, much to the chagrin of the other passengers. The second features Hubby grudgingly taking the family en masse out on his brand new Butterfly Six automobile (with disastrous results), and the third is an escapade with his sleepwalking mother-in-law. The third segment almost qualifies the film as a horror movie, as in it, Hubby mistakenly believes he has killed his mother-in-law, and when she starts sleepwalking later, he thinks she's a ghost haunting him.

Cast

Production
The film is a light comedy with minimal character development, and followed Lloyd’s early 1920s pattern of alternating what he called “gag pictures” with “character pictures”. Some distributors had complained about the length of his previous elaborate feature Girl Shy, and Hot Water was the response.  Its storyline was also interesting as a unique departure from most of Lloyd’s 1920s features, because his character was married with a family, and was not striving for success, recognition, or romance.  It was popular at the box office and grossed $1,350,000, an excellent return for a film of the period. The fictional "Butterfly Six" was in reality a 1923 Chevrolet Superior Sedan.

Renewed interest in Harold Lloyd
In 1962, the "live turkey" and "Butterfly Six automobile" sequences were included in a compilation film produced by Harold Lloyd himself entitled Harold Lloyd's World of Comedy. The film premiered at the Cannes Film Festival and created a renewal of interest in the comedian by introducing him to a whole new generation.

Critic Christopher Workman comments "At a way, way too long 59 minutes, "Hot Water" relies on a seemingly endless succession of pratfalls for its yuks. The only horror-tinged segment is the third.....Still and all, the film was a huge success."

References

External links

 
 
 
 
 
 ~Hot Water~ 1924 at silenthollywood.com

1924 films
1924 comedy films
American silent feature films
American black-and-white films
Films directed by Fred C. Newmeyer
Films directed by Sam Taylor
Silent American comedy films
Pathé Exchange films
1920s American films